Henry Shepherd Pearson (c. 1775–1840) was acting Governor of Penang from 1807 to 1808.

According to "The Worthies of Westmorland" by George Atkinson, Pearson was the second son of Sir Richard Pearson and Hannah Shepherd. He was christened at Saint Mary the Virgin in Dover, Kent on 8 February 1777. Another source holds that he was born in Dover on 20 October 1776 and that his mother was the former Margaret Harrison. In 1820 he married Caroline Lyons, daughter of John Lyons of Antigua and Catherine Walrond, and had the following children:

Caroline Pearson (1827–1909), who married barrister and solicitor Charles Evan-Thomas of Glamorganshire, Cardiff, Wales
Augusta Pearson (c. 1828–1922), who married barrister and solicitor George Arthur Knightley Howman (later Little)
Emily Pearson (1830–1876), who married Captain Cowper Phipps Coles, R.N.
Richard Lyons Otway Pearson (1831–1890)
Henrietta Maria Pearson (1832–1890), who married Sterling Browne Westhorp
Agnes Minna Pearson (1835–1908), who married the Rev. Richard Lister Venables in 1867 and had two daughters: Katherine Minna (1870–1956), who married Sir Charles Leyshon Dillwyn-Venables-Llewelyn, 2nd Bt., and Caroline Emily Venables (1872–1963)

When Pearson was writing his will (held in National Archives, PROB 11/1931, Image Reference 227/203) in July 1839, he noted that he was "formerly of Bombay" but currently was "of Liverpool House, Dover" (actually Walmer, Kent) and was residing in Boulogne Sur Mer, Kingdom of France. He continued to live in Boulogne Sur Mer and was there when he wrote a final codicil to his will on 14 January 1840. In his will, Pearson wrote that he wished to be buried where he died in the plainest manner possible. Evidence from the proving of his will on 28 July 1840 would suggest that he died in Boulogne Sur Mer in mid-July 1840 and is probably buried there. Another source gives his date of death as 13 April 1840.

April 1807
April 4. Mr. W. C. Clubley, appointed deputy secretary. Government Orders. Fort Cornwallis 10 April. The whole of the troops at the presidency to parade this afternoon, at half past four o'clock, in front of the Government-house, to attend the remains of the honourable Philip Dundas, late Governor of this island, to the place of interment, with all military honours due to his high rank and station. Lieutenant-colonel Basset to command. Three rounds of light cartridges per man to be served to the 20th regiment, which corps only is to fire over the grave, on account of the narrowness of the ground. Forty-five-minute guns, corresponding with the years of age of the deceased, are to be held in readiness to be fired during the funeral procession and to be commenced by a signal from the Government-house. The Bengal artillery furnished the carrying party. The garrison colours are to be hoisted at half mast at sun-rise and continue until sunset. (signed) JOHN DRUMMOND, Town Major. 13 April. A salute of 19 guns to be fired, on H. S. Pearson Esq. taking his seat as governor of this island. Also a salute of 11 guns on W. E. Phillips, Esq. taking his seat as a member of the council. By order of the honourable the governor and council. (signed) Thomas Raffles, Secretary to government.

October 1807
Occurrences for October. Oct. 17. Yesterday the Hon. Colonel Norman Macalister in conformity with the orders of the hon. the governor-general in council took the usual oaths and his seat as governor of this presidency. A salute of 19 guns was fired on the occasion. Henry Shepherd Pearson Esq. also took the oaths and his seat, as the second member of the council. Appointments. Captain M'Innes, to be private secretary to the governor, with the established salary of 120 Spanish dollars per month. Lieut. Robert Campbell, to act as aids-de-camp to the hon. the governor. Mr. Robert Ibbetson, to be assistant in the collector's office. Mr. Quintin Dick Thompson, to be paymaster, and commissary of provisions and petty stores. Mr. John Macalister, to be an assistant collector of customs and land revenues at Malacca. Mr. William Bennet, to be assistant to the warehouse-keeper. The office of deputy warehouse-keeper is to be abolished from the first of the ensuing month. Henry Shepherd Pearson, Esq. to be warehouse-keeper and paymaster. Mr. J. C. Lawrence is to be acting Malay translator to the government.

Notes and references 

1775 births
1840 deaths
 Governors of Penang
 History of Penang
 Year of birth uncertain